The British film industry produced over five hundred feature films in 2013. This article fully lists all non-pornographic films, including short films, that had a release date in that year and which were at least partly made by the United Kingdom. It does not include films first released in previous years that had release dates in 2013.

Also included is an overview of the major events in British film, including film festivals and awards ceremonies, as well as lists of those films that were particularly well received, both critically and financially. The year was particularly notable for a number of low budget and independent horror films, such as In Fear, Devil's Pass, Dementamania and Stalled.

Major releases

January – March

April – June

July – September

October – December

Minor releases

{| class="wikitable sortable plainrowheaders"
|+ "align=bottom" |
|- style="background:#b0e0e6; text-align:center;"
! style="width:25%;"| Title
! style="width:25%;"| Director
! style="width:30%;"| Release date
! style="width:10%;"| Genre
|-
|15 Minutes to Inverness
|| David Rodowick
|| 
|| Adventure
|-
|2 Graves
|| Yvonne Mc Devitt
|| 28 June 2013 (UK)
|| Drama
|-
|4:00 am
|| Robert Trott
|| 
|| Drama
|-
|7 Reasons Why
|| Gurmit Samra
|| 15 May 2013 (France)
|| Drama
|-

|Abducted
|| Mark Harris
|| 
|| Action
|-
|Acquainted
|| Horace Chan
|| 
|| Drama
|-
|Act I
|| Wilson P.Y. Lau
|| 16 March 2013 (UK)
|| Thriller
|-
|Addict
|| Geoff Harmer
|| 12 April 2014 (UK)
|| Drama
|-
|Adieu Marx
|| Charis Orchard
|| 
|| Comedy
|-
|Ain't Misbehavin'''
|| Oliver Sillito
|| 28 September 2013 (UK)
|| Comedy
|-
|Ali: The Greatest|| Billy Simpson
|| 8 November 2013 (USA)
|| Biography
|-
|All Good Things|| Krysten Resnick
|| 17 July 2013 (UK)
|| Adventure
|-
|Amber|| Miles Watts
|| 
|| Comedy
|-
|Amnesiac|| Martin Rutley
|| 1 March 2013 (UK)
|| Drama
|-
|Amoc|| Erim Metto
|| 
|| Drama
|-
|The Anarchist's Birthday|| Patrick Blake
|| 
|| Comedy
|-
|Angelina Ballerina: Dance Around the World|| Charlotte Spencer
|| January 2013 (USA)
|| 
|-
|Anna: Scream Queen Killer|| The Aquinas
|| September 2013 (USA)
|| Drama
|-
|Another Knight to Remember|| Geoff Wonfor
|| 1 May 2013 (UK)
|| Musical
|-
|The Answer to Everything|| Rupert Jones
|| April 2013 (UK)
|| Drama
|-
|Any Minute Now|| Peter Goddard
|| 15 October 2013 (USA)
|| Drama
|-
|The Arbiter|| Kadri Kõusaar
|| 14 March 2013 (Estonia)
|| Drama
|-
|Art Is...|| Barry Bliss
|| April 2013 (UK)
|| Musical
|-
|Ashens and the Quest for the Gamechild|| Riyad Barmania
|| 8 August 2013 (UK)
|| Adventure
|-
|Assignment|| Paul T.T. Easter
|| 21 October 2013 (UK)
|| Thriller
|-
|Aune, or on Effective Demise|| Maija Timonen
|| January 2013 (UK)
|| Horror
|-
|AutoMatron, Welcome to Paradise|| Andrew Senior
|| 
|| Adventure
|-
|Back to the Garden|| Jon Sanders
|| 22 September 2013 (UK)
|| Drama
|-
|Back with the Boys Again – Auf Wiedersehen Pet 30th Anniversary Reunion|| Geoff Wonfor
|| 1 December 2013 (UK)
|| Biography
|-
|Barbarian|| Robin Morningstar
|| 5 November 2014 (UK)
|| Fantasy
|-
|Barg Rizan|| Ali Jaberansari
|| 25 August 2013 (Canada)
|| Drama
|-
|Before Dawn|| Dominic Brunt
|| 8 June 2013 (Japan)
|| Horror
|-
|The Befuddled Box of Betty Buttifint|| Janis Pugh
|| 
|| Drama
|-
|Behind the Eyes|| Chris Cory
|| 8 July 2013 (UK)
|| Thriller
|-
|Behind the Scenes of Total Hell|| Andy Wilton
|| 22 April 2013 (UK)
|| Comedy
|-
|Behold Me Standing|| Wilma Smith
|| 7 July 2013 (UK)
|| Drama
|-
|Benjamin Britten: Peace and Conflict|| Tony Britten
|| February 2013 (UK)
|| Biography
|-
|The Better Man|| Josh Bennett
|| June 2013 (UK)
|| Comedy
|-
|The Betrayal of Paul Cezanne|| Mike Akester
|| 
|| Drama
|-
|Black Lightning Dream|| Nicky Preston
|| 
|| Horror
|-
|Blackbird|| Jamie Chambers
|| 25 June 2013 (UK)
|| Drama
|-
|Blisters for Blighty: The Curious World of Race Walking|| Michael Normand
|| 28 June 2013 (UK)
|| Comedy
|-
|Bloodline|| David Easton
|| 6 June 2013 (UK)
|| Thriller
|-
|Borderlands|| Ben Mallaby
|| 
|| Action
|-
|Born of War|| Vicky Jewson
|| 5 December 2013 (Cyprus)
|| Action
|-
|Boys Behind Bars|| Jason Impey
|| 13 October 2013 (UK)
|| Drama
|-
|Breakfast with Jonny Wilkinson|| Simon Sprackling
|| 22 November 2013 (UK)
|| Comedy
|-
|Breathless Awakening|| Djonny Chen
|| 2013 (UK)
|| Drama
|-
|The Brightest Colours Make Grey|| Daniel Audritt
|| 4 July 2013 (UK)
|| Comedy
|-
|Bruno & Earlene Go to Vegas|| Simon Savory
|| 9 July 2013 (UK)
|| Adventure
|-
|The Buskers & Lou|| Alex Cassun
|| 1 August 2013 (USA)
|| Drama
|-
|C.A.M.|| Steve Du Melo
|| 
|| Horror
|-
|The Captive|| Luke Massey
|| 7 January 2014 (USA)
|| Horror
|-
|Cardiff City Season Review 2012–2013|| Graham Keyte
|| 10 June 2013 (UK)
|| Sports
|-
|Carlos Gustavo|| Master Chet
|| 
|| Action
|-
|Carpe Diem|| Eric Hinwood
|| 
|| Adventure
|-
|The Cashier|| Radley Mason
|| 
|| Comedy
|-
|Castles Made of Sand|| Mungo Benson
|| 20 November 2013 (UK)
|| Drama
|-
|The Chase|| Faolan Jones
||
|| Action
|-
|Chasing Borders|| Ryan Claffey
|| 3 September 2013 (UK)
|| Drama
|-
|Christmas Hear Kids|| Chris Purnell
|| 1 December 2013 (UK)
|| Drama
|-
|Chronicles of Humanity: Uprising|| Damien Valentine
|| 15 April 2013 (UK)
|| Animation
|-
|City of Tales|| Johny Brown
|| 6 September 2013 (UK)
|| Musical
|-
|Coffee in Winter|| Manjeet S Gill
|| 
|| Drama
|-
|Cold Turkey|| Rob Ineson
|| 31 July 2013 (UK)
|| Drama
|-
|The Comedy Store: Raw & Uncut|| Jon Lloyd
|| 22 February 2013 (UK)
|| Comedy
|-
|Common People|| Stewart Alexander
|| 10 June 2014 (UK)
|| Comedy
|-
|Communion|| Greg Hall
|| 1 August 2013 (UK)
|| Drama
|-
|Confine|| Tobias Tobbell
|| 1 July 2013 (UK)
|| Thriller
|-
|The Crack|| Phil Vasili
|| 2013 (UK)
|| Comedy
|-
|Crossland|| Mumtaz Yildirimlar
|| 5 January 2013 (UK)
|| Thriller
|-
|Cruel as a Wound|| Kevin Lucero Less
|| 21 June 2013 (USA)
|| Drama
|-
|Damaged Goods|| Mike Tweddle
|| 18 August 2013 (UK)
|| Drama
|-
|Dance of the Steel Bars|| Cesar Apolinario
|| 12 June 2013 (Philippines)
|| Drama
|-
|Dante's Daemon|| Wyndham Price
|| 31 May 2013 (UK)
|| Drama
|-
|Dark Rainbow|| Sam Baxter
|| February 2013 (UK)
|| Comedy
|-
|The Dead Inside|| Andrew Gilbert
|| 14 October 2013 (UK)
|| Action
|-
|Dead of the Nite|| S.J. Evans
|| 4 April 2013 (UK)
|| Horror
|-
|Dead Walkers: Rise of the 4th Reich|| Philip Gardiner
|| 1 April 2014 (UK)
|| Horror
|-
|Deadly Intent|| Rebekah Fortune
|| 
|| Drama
|-
|Delicious|| Tammy Riley-Smith
|| 5 October 2013 (South Korea)
|| Comedy
|-
|Delight|| Gareth Jones
|| 1 August 2014 (UK)
|| Drama
|-
|Detention|| Erim Metto
||
|| Drama
|-
|The Devil's Plantation|| May Miles Thomas
|| 23 February 2013 (UK)
|| Mystery
|-
|The Diana Clone|| Jason Ritchie
||
|| Comedy
|-
|Dimension Zero|| Andrew MacKenzie
|| 7 April 2013 (UK)
|| Drama
|-
|Discord|| Daniel Mckenzie-Cossou
|| 2013 (UK)
|| Action
|-
|Dissection|| 
|| 
|| Horror
|-
|Doctor Who: Besieged|| Lauren Lamarr
|| 7 June 2013 (UK)
|| Science fiction
|-
|The Dossier|| Jennifer Darling
|| 2013 (UK)
|| Drama
|-
|Dream On|| Lloyd Eyre-Morgan
|| 10 June 2013 (UK)
|| Drama
|-
|Dumar|| Aaron Thomas
|| 27 December 2013 (UK)
|| Thriller
|-
|The Dying Eye|| Shiphrah Meditz
|| 1 October 2013 (UK)
|| Crime
|-
|Dying Light|| David Newbigging
|| 
|| Horror
|-
|e-luv|| Warren Dudley
|| 1 February 2013 (UK)
|| Comedy
|-
|The East London Story: Slap or Die|| Sukhdeep Sanghera
|| 26 December 2013 (UK)
|| Comedy
|-
|Eat. Sleep. Repeat.|| Colin Grant
|| 
|| Comedy
|-
|Eddie Izzard: Force Majeure Live|| Sarah Townsend
|| 18 November 2013 (UK)
|| Comedy
|-
|Elbow Live at Jodrell Bank|| Matt Askem
|| 25 November 2013 (UK)
|| Musical
|-
|Emeli Sandé Live at the Royal Albert Hall|| Paul Dugdale
|| 18 February 2013 (UK)
|| Musical
|-
|Endless Life|| Michael MacBroom
|| May 2013 (UK)
|| Comedy
|-
|The Enigma|| Gage Oxley
|| 11 December 2013 (UK)
|| Drama
|-
|Entwinement|| Rob Burrows
|| 1 May 2013 (UK)
|| Drama
|-
|Environmental Enforcement|| Louisa Rowley
|| 
|| Comedy
|-
|Essex Boys Retribution|| Paul Tanter
|| 2 December 2014 (Netherlands)
|| Crime
|-
|The Essex Warriors|| Eddie Bammeke
||
|| Action
|-
|Eva and Noah|| Richard Hajdú
|| 
|| Drama
|-
|Eva's Diamond|| Ice Neal
|| 2 February 2013 (USA)
|| Drama
|-
|Event 15|| Matthew Thompson
|| 17 June 2014 (USA)
|| Thriller
|-
|Event of the Year|| Anthony M. Winson
|| 25 October 2013 (UK)
|| Horror
|-
|Evil Bread|| Andy Ward
|| 12 July 2013 (UK)
|| Comedy
|-
|Evil Scarecrow: Head, Shoulders, Knees & Crows|| Evil Scarecrow
|| 2 November 2013 (UK)
|| Musical
|-
|Exodus|| Mina Radovic
|| 24 June 2013 (UK)
|| Science fiction
|-
|Exorcist Chronicles|| Philip Gardiner
|| 1 April 2013 (USA)
|| Horror
|-
|The Factory|| Richard John Taylor
|| 26 January 2013 (UK)
|| Romance
|-
|Fallen Angels|| Luke Mordue
|| 7 July 2013 (UK)
|| Crime
|-
|The Fallen Word|| Oliver Harrison
|| 10 May 2013 (UK)
|| Drama
|-
|A Fallible Girl|| Conrad Clark
|| 27 January 2013 (Netherlands)
|| Drama
|-
|Faraway|| Stephen Don
|| 18 April 2013 (UK)
|| Action
|-
|Fast Life|| Creeper Crisis
|| 
|| Drama
|-
|Faust's Growth|| John Eyre
|| 
|| Drama
|-
|The Film-Maker's Son|| Bart Gavigan
|| September 2013 (UK)
|| Drama
|-
|First Light|| Tom Calder
|| 
|| Drama
|-
|Five Pillars|| Jon Rosling
|| 
|| Drama
|-
|The Flight of the Flamingo|| Nick Hilton
|| 
|| Comedy
|-
|Foals Live at the Royal Albert Hall|| Dave Ma
|| 28 October 2013 (UK)
|| Musical
|-
|The Fold|| John Jencks
|| 28 March 2014 (UK)
|| Drama
|-
|Folie à Trois|| Danielle Jadelyn
|| 
|| Drama
|-
|Followed|| Wilson P.Y. Lau
|| 
|| Crime
|-
|Following the Wicca Man|| Jacqueline Kirkham
|| 29 November 2013 (UK)
|| Horror
|-
|For Love's Sake|| Andrew Walkington
|| 17 June 2013 (USA)
|| Drama
|-
|Friends of Money|| Adam Lee Hamilton
|| 26 April 2013 (UK)
|| Drama
|-
|Fulham Season Review 2012–2013|| Graham Keyte
|| 17 June 2013 (UK)
|| Sport
|-
|Future Shift|| Suza Singh
|| 9 December 2013 (Canada)
|| Action
|-
|Game, But Whose Game Is It?|| Miles Roston
|| 2 September 2013 (Netherlands)
|| Drama
|-
|Gangsters, Goons & Psychopaths|| Ranjeet S. Marwa
|| 18 September 2013 (UK)
|| Comedy
|-
|Get Lucky|| Sacha Bennett
|| 21 March 2013 (Bahrain)
|| Action
|-
|Gilgamesh|| Edward Picot
|| 
|| Animation
|-
|Going Under|| Anthony Crossland
|| July 2013 (UK)
|| Drama
|-
|Great Expectations|| Graham McLaren
|| 21 March 2013 (USA)
|| Drama
|-
|The Great Sherlock Holmes Debate 4|| Steve Emecz
|| 1 July 2013 (UK)
|| 
|-
|The Great Walk|| Clive Austin
|| 22 February 2013 (UK)
|| Comedy
|-
|Grid|| Callum Rees
|| 1 March 2013 (UK)
|| Action
|-
|The Gun, the Cake and the Butterfly|| Amanda Eliasch
|| 31 May 2013 (UK)
|| Drama
|-
|Halloween One Good Scare|| David Hastings
|| 25 October 2013 (UK)
|| Historical
|-
|Ham & the Piper|| Mark Norfolk
|| 7 April 2013 (USA)
|| Drama
|-
|Happy Hours|| Steve Sullivan
|| 
|| Comedy
|-
|The Harbinger|| Martin Tempest
|| 4 December 2013 (UK)
|| Adventure
|-
|Harrigan|| Vince Woods
|| 20 September 2013 (UK)
|| Action
|-
|Haunted|| Steven M. Smith
|| 21 October 2013 (USA)
|| Horror
|-
|Haze and Fog|| Cao Fei
|| 22 September 2013 (UK)
|| 
|-
|Hear the Doors|| Leonora Lim-Moore
|| 
|| Drama
|-
|Heckle|| Robbie Moffat
|| 2013 (UK)
|| Comedy
|-
|Hector's Wait|| Nick Box
|| 1 April 2013 (UK)
|| Animation
|-
|Hello Carter|| Anthony Wilcox
|| 12 October 2013 (UK)
|| Comedy
|-
|Hero Shy|| Oskarjon Ho' Chan
|| September 2013 (USA)
|| Comedy
|-
|Hichestan|| Hernan Diaz Laserna
|| 11 October 2013 (Iran)
|| Drama
|-
|Histoires de l'âge d'or islamique|| Teresa Griffiths
|| 2013 (France)
|| Historical
|-
|Hollows Wood 3D|| Richard Connew
|| 31 May 2013 (UK)
|| Drama
|-
|Horrorshow|| Grant McPhee
|| 3 February 2013 (UK)
|| Musical
|-
|Hot Wings|| Mitch Panayis
|| 1 June 2013 (UK)
|| Crime
|-
|Hotspot|| Vitor Vilela
|| 13 April 2013 (UK)
|| Fantasy
|-
|Hotspot: Log in at Own Risk|| Vitor Vilela
|| 
|| Fantasy
|-
|How to Become a Criminal Mastermind|| Henry Scriven
|| 11 September 2013 (UK)
|| Comedy
|-
|HSP: There Is No Escape from the Terrors Of the Mind|| Rouzbeh Rashidi
|| September 2013 (Australia)
|| Fantasy
|-
|Hundreds Tens and Units|| Georg Schmidt
|| 
|| Drama
|-
|I Am from Chile|| Gonzalo Diaz
|| 10 April 2014 (Chile)
|| Comedy
|-
|I Know What I'm Doing|| Robbie Moffat
|| 20 May 2013 (France)
|| Comedy
|-
|I, a Slave|| Suj Ahmed
|| 1 October 2013 (Romania)
|| Drama
|-
|I Was Saddam's Son|| 
|| 14 June 2015 (UK)
|| Biography
|-
|Ice Dancing the Raw Edge|| Jim Ford
|| 21 January 2013 (UK)
|| Sport
|-
|An Illustrated Silence|| Jasmine Wingfield
|| 17 August 2013 (USA)
|| Musical
|-
|I'm Still Here|| Kris Smith
|| 1 September 2013 (UK)
|| Drama
|-
|Impirioso|| Sarah Baker
|| 1 June 2013 (UK)
|| Drama
|-
|In Mid Wickedness|| William Oldroyd
|| 2 December 2013 (UK)
|| Drama
|-
|In the Middle of No One|| Paul Wheeler
|| 1 January 2013 (UK)
|| Comedy
|-
|The Inconsiderates|| Jason Ritchie
|| 
|| Comedy
|-
|Inside the Mind of Mr D.H.Lawrence|| Armand Attard
|| 20 January 2013 (UK)
|| Drama
|-
|Internal|| Hursty
|| 10 June 2013 (UK)
|| Crime
|-
|Island|| Rehan Malik
|| October 2013 (UK)
|| Thriller
|-
|Isolated|| Justin Le Pera
|| 30 January 2013 (USA)
|| Adventure
|-
|It's a Lot|| Darwood Grace
|| 25 October 2013 (UK)
|| Comedy
|-
|It's a Love Thing|| Andy Dodd
|| 3 December 2015 (USA)
|| Romance
|-
|Jack Dee: So What? Live|| Paul Wheeler
|| 2013 (UK)
|| Comedy
|-
|Jayson Bend: Queen and Country|| Matt Carter
|| 
|| Action
|-
|Jeff Wayne's Musical Version of the War of the Worlds Alive on Stage! The New Generation|| Nick Morris
|| 11 April 2013 (UK)
|| Musical
|-
|Jessie J: Alive at the O2|| Paul Caslin
||
|| Musical
|-
|Judas Ghost|| Simon Pearce
|| 20 April 2015 (UK)
|| Fantasy
|-
|Justin Timberlake: Suited Up|| Billy Simpson
|| 
|| Musical
|-
|Kain: In the Arms of Chaos|| Matt Brownsett
|| 2013 (UK)
|| Musical
|-
|Karl's Birthday|| Donald Takeshita-Guy
|| 14 September 2013 (UK)
|| Drama
|-
|Kid Gloves|| Adam Simcox
|| 2 March 2015 (UK)
|| Drama
|-
|Knight of the Dead|| Mark Atkins
|| 30 October 2014 (Kuwait)
|| Action
|-
|Kubricks|| Dean Cavanagh
|| 23 May 2013 (UK)
|| Drama
|-
|Lad: A Yorkshire Story|| Dan Hartley
|| 25 April 2013 (USA)
|| Drama
|-
|Lal|| Semir Aslanyürek
|| 25 April 2014 (Turkey)
|| Drama
|-
|The Last British Execution|| Iain Cash
|| 26 April 2013 (UK)
|| Comedy
|-
|Learning Hebrew|| Louis Joon
|| 13 June 2013 (UK)
|| Drama
|-
|Leave to Remain|| Bruce Goodison
|| October 2013 (UK)
|| Drama
|-
|Leave to Stay|| Awat Osman Ali
|| 23 September 2013 (UK)
|| Drama
|-
|Legendary: Tomb of the Dragon|| Eric Styles
|| 1 January 2014 (China)
|| Action
|-
|Les Vêpres siciliennes|| Eugène Scribe
|| 4 November 2013 (UK)
|| Drama
|-
|Letters to Sofija|| Robert Mullan
|| 30 August 2013 (Lithuania)
|| 
|-
|The Library|| Daljinder Singh
|| 3 May 2014 (UK)
|| Horror
|-
|The List|| Klaus Hüttmann
|| 2 November 2013 (Japan)
|| Thriller
|-
|Little Devil|| Max Barber
|| 
|| Comedy
|-
|The Lobito|| Antonio Dyaz
|| 16 October 2013 (Spain)
|| Biography
|-
|London Kahanis|| Armaan Kirmani
|| 22 June 2013 (UK)
|| Drama
|-
|Lone Walker|| Paul T.T. Easter
|| 13 May 2013 (UK)
|| Drama
|-
|A Long Way from Home|| Virginia Gilbert
|| 6 December 2013 (UK)
|| Drama
|-
|Longtails|| Elizabeth Arends
|| 
|| Crime
|-
|Loony in the Woods|| Leo Leigh
|| 2013 (USA)
|| Horror
|-
|The Lost Choices|| 
||
|| Drama
|-
|The Lost Generation|| Mark Ashmore
|| 11 November 2013 (UK)
|| Thriller
|-
|Lost in Fugue|| Errol Theriot
|| 2013 (UK)
|| Drama
|-
|The Lost Mantle of Elijah|| Lewis Critchley
|| 21 May 2013 (UK)
|| Adventure
|-
|Love Freely But Pay for Sex|| Phoenix James
|| 21 May 2013 (UK)
|| Action
|-
|Love Me Till Monday|| Justin Hardy
|| 11 July 2014 (UK)
|| Romance
|-
|Made in Belfast|| Paul Kennedy
|| 2013 (UK)
|| Drama
|-
|The Magnificent Eleven|| Jeremy Wooding
|| 13 May 2013 (UK)
|| Comedy
|-
|Magpie|| Marc Price
|| 18 April 2013 (UK)
|| 
|-
|The Making of Us|| Graham Eatough
|| 23 June 2013 (UK)
|| Drama
|-
|Mandela: Resistance|| NJ Silva
|| 
|| Biography
|-
|A Mass for the Dying|| Al Carretta
|| 30 November 2013 (UK)
|| Drama
|-
|Mayerling|| Jeff Tudor
|| 13 June 2013 (UK)
|| Musical
|-
|McFly: 10th Anniversary Concert – Royal Albert Hall|| David Spearing
|| 16 December 2013 (UK)
|| Musical
|-
|Meet Me on the Southbank|| Adam Rolston
|| 
|| Comedy
|-
|The Merchant|| Justin Mosley
|| 3 March 2013 (USA)
|| Drama
|-
|Merrily We Roll Along|| George Furth
|| 23 October 2013 (USA)
|| Musical
|-
|Metal Castle: The Musical|| David Georgiou
|| 5 September 2013 (UK)
|| Comedy
|-
|Miley Cyrus: Twerk It|| NJ Silva
||
|| Musical
|-
|The Minnitts of Anabeg|| Alan Brown
||
|| Drama
|-
|Mirrorvael|| Nick Convery
|| 14 April 2013 (UK)
|| Fantasy
|-
|Mistaken|| Anthony Roberts
|| 1 July 2013 (UK)
|| Action
|-
|Mister John|| Joe Lawlor
|| 27 September 2013 (UK)
|| Drama
|-
|Molly Crows|| Ray Wilkes
|| 5 April 2014 (UK)
|| Horror
|-
|More Sex, Lies & Depravity|| Jason Impey
|| 22 February 2013 (UK)
|| Drama
|-
|The Mule|| Michael Radford
|| 10 May 2013 (Spain)
|| Comedy
|-
|A Musical Review|| Sally Martin
|| 1 February 2013 (UK)
|| Musical
|-
|Narcissist|| Michael Henry
|| 1 April 2013 (UK)
|| Comedy
|-
|Nelson Mandela: The Struggle Is My Life (1918–2013)|| Tom Barbor-Might
|| 6 December 2013 (UK)
|| Biography
|-
|The Neuropath|| Jack Murdoch
|| 
|| Comedy
|-
|The Neverending Love Story|| Sathish Kumar
|| 19 January 2013 (UK)
|| Thriller
|-
|Newcastle United Season Review 2012–2013|| Graham Keyte
|| 17 June 2013 (UK)
|| Sport
|-
|Night of the Bloody Antler|| Lea Cummings
|| 
|| Horror
|-
|The Night of the Great Chinese Lottery|| Marco Brunelli
|| 
|| Comedy
|-
|Night of the Living 3D Dead|| Samuel Victor
|| 7 October 2013 (UK)
|| Horror
|-
|Nightmare|| Andrew Compton
|| May 2013 (UK)
|| Drama
|-
|No Smoke|| Sue Shearing
|| 3 September 2013 (UK)
|| Crime
|-
|A Noisy Delivery|| Gerald Jupitter-Larsen
|| April 2013 (UK)
|| Drama
|-
|Not Guilty|| Taiwo Oniye
|| 22 July 2013 (USA)
|| Drama
|-
|O heimonas|| Konstantinos Koutsoliotas
|| 10 December 2014 (Greece)
|| Drama
|-
|The O'Briens|| Richard Waters
|| 28 April 2013 (USA)
|| Comedy
|-
|One|| Brian George Hutton
|| 
|| Drama
|-
|One Man Flash Mob: The Lucien Simon Story|| Lorn Macdonald
|| 10 September 2013 (UK)
|| Comedy
|-
|Onus|| George Clarke
|| 4 February 2013 (UK)
|| Drama
|-
|Onye Ozi|| Obi Emelonye
|| 18 October 2013 (UK)
|| Comedy
|-
|The Orchard|| Clive Myer
|| September 2013 (UK)
|| Drama
|-
|The Oscar Nominated Short Films 2013: Animation|| 
|| 1 February 2013 (USA)
|| Animation
|-
|Our Last Summer|| David Burtonwood
|| 28 April 2013 (UK)
|| Drama
|-
|Owlman|| Richard Mansfield
|| 
|| Drama
|-
|Paradise Place|| Paride Odierna
|| 20 December 2013 (UK)
|| Comedy
|-
|Peter Grimes on Aldeburgh Beach|| Margaret Williams
|| 1 September 2013 (UK)
|| Musical
|-
|Pictures of Lily|| Mark Banks
|| 
|| Drama
|-
|Piercing Brightness|| Shezad Dawood
|| June 2013 (UK)
|| Drama
|-
|The Pink Marble Egg|| Jonathan King
|| 15 May 2013 (France)
|| Musical
|-
|The Possession of Billy|| Robert Valentine
|| 1 September 2013 (UK)
|| Horror
|-
|The Possession of Sophie Love|| Philip Gardiner
|| 17 September 2013 (USA)
|| Horror
|-
|The Power|| Paul Hills
|| 2013 (UK)
|| Horror
|-
|Primary School Musical!|| Angus Reid
|| 
|| Musical
|-
|Project Reveal Real Ghost Hunters|| Lee Steer
|| 20 February 2013 (UK)
|| Horror
|-
|Punk '76|| Mark Sloper
|| 22 October 2013 (UK)
|| Musical
|-
|Queen Elizabeth II – The Diamond Celebration|| Alan Byron
|| 
|| Biography
|-
|Quest: A Tall Tale|| Thomas G. Murphy
|| 
|| Animation
|-
|The Rajini Effect|| Kuvera Sivalingam
|| 
|| Comedy
|-
|Rambler|| Patrick Quagliano
|| November 2013 (USA)
|| Action
|-
|Ravenswood|| Marq English
|| 1 June 2013 (UK)
|| Comedy
|-
|Red Sky|| Patrick Michael Ryder
|| 20 November 2013 (UK)
|| Thriller
|-
|Rehab|| Sean J. Vincent
|| 
|| Horror
|-
|The Repairman|| Paolo Mitton
|| 19 February 2014 (Italy)
|| Comedy
|-
|Reprieve 2013|| Luke Thomas Goold
|| 1 June 2013 (UK)
|| Drama
|-
|Rewind 4Ever: The History of UK Garage|| Alex Lawton
|| 15 July 2013 (UK)
|| Musical
|-
|Ring of Faith|| Kevin McIntyre
|| 
|| Drama
|-
|Robbie Williams Live from Tallinn|| Russell Thomas
|| 20 August 2013 (UK)
|| Musical
|-
|Robbie Williams: Take the Crown 2013|| Russell Thomas
|| 20 August 2013 (UK)
|| Musical
|-
|Rock and Roll Fuck'n'Lovely|| Josh Bagnall
|| 18 February 2013 (UK)
|| Drama
|-
|Roger|| Nachi Minesaki
|| 1 July 2013 (UK)
|| Drama
|-
|Rölli ja kultainen avain|| Taavi Vartia
|| 1 February 2013 (Finland)
|| Adventure
|-
|Roly's List|| Steven Hines
|| 21 March 2013 (UK)
|| Comedy
|-
|Royal Shakespeare Company: Richard II|| Gregory Doran
|| 13 November 2013 (UK)
|| Drama
|-
|RSJ|| Rob Walker
||
|| Comedy
|-
|The Rubicon|| Chucks Mordi
|| 24 October 2013 (UK)
|| Drama
|-
|Rubicon or: Let's Talk About Hell|| Frank Gelmeroda
|| 19 October 2013 (USA)
|| Thriller
|-
|Russell Brand: Messiah Complex|| Russell Brand
|| 25 November 2013 (UK)
|| Comedy
|-
|Sable Fable|| Stephen Lloyd Jackson
|| 17 June 2013 (USA)
|| Drama
|-
|Sacrifice|| Ryan Claffey
|| 31 August 2013 (UK)
|| Crime
|-
|Saint Petersburg|| Andrey Khvostov
|| 10 August 2013 (Russia)
|| Drama
|-
|The Samuel Coleridge-Taylor Story|| Jason Young
|| 1 April 2013 (UK)
|| Animation
|-
|Sarah's Room|| Grant McPhee
|| 10 December 2013 (UK)
|| Fantasy
|-
|Save the Zombies|| Federico Lopez
|| 25 April 2014 (Spain)
|| Horror
|-
|Scar Tissue|| Scott Michell
|| 16 February 2015 (UK)
|| Thriller
|-
|Scarred|| Gareth Fient
|| 20 April 2013 (UK)
|| Drama
|-
|Scavenger Hunt|| Robert Carrier
||
|| Adventure
|-
|Scorbie Relapse Live|| Sam North
|| 25 June 2013 (UK)
|| Musical
|-
|The Search for Simon|| Martin Gooch
|| 3 May 2013 (UK)
|| Comedy
|-
|Second Last Land|| Thomas Nerling
||
|| Drama
|-
|Self Induced Nightmares|| Dan Brownlie
|| 4 November 2013 (UK)
|| Horror
|-
|The Shadow of Bigfoot|| Philip Mearns
|| 1 January 2013 (UK)
|| Thriller
|-
|Shakespeare's Globe: Henry V|| Dominic Dromgoole
|| 1 July 2013 (UK)
|| Comedy
|-
|Shame the Devil|| Paul Tanter
|| 30 June 2014 (UK)
|| Crime
|-
|Shameful Deceit|| Ruke Amata
|| 5 July 2013 (UK)
|| Drama
|-
|Shaqami Dr Qassimlu|| Fathy Mirzaeian
|| 2 May 2013 (Iraq)
|| Drama
|-
|Sheffield Wednesday Season Review 2012–2013|| Graham Keyte
|| 15 July 2013 (UK)
|| Sport
|-
|Shockwaves|| Kasumi X
|| 
|| Comedy
|-
|Shortcuts to Hell: Volume 1|| Debbie Attwell
|| 23 August 2013 (UK)
|| Horror
|-
|Side by Side|| Arthur Landon
|| 12 October 2013 (UK)
|| Drama
|-
|Sixteen|| Rob Brown
|| 14 October 2013 (UK)
|| Thriller
|-
|The Sky in Bloom|| Toor Mian
|| 16 May 2013 (UK)
|| Crime
|-
|Sleeper|| Mark Burnett
|| January 2013 (UK)
|| Science fiction
|-
|Sleeping Dogs|| Floris Ramaekers
|| 5 October 2013 (UK)
|| Thriller
|-
|Soho Cigarette|| Jonathan Fairbairn
|| 
|| Action
|-
|Solito|| Amit Gicelter
|| 30 September 2013 (UK)
|| Comedy
|-
|Sommarstället|| Johan von Reybekiel
|| 21 April 2013 (Sweden)
|| Drama
|-
|Soulmate|| Axelle Carolyn
|| 26 October 2013 (UK)
|| Horror
|-
|Sound of Silence|| Jorge Malpica
|| 
|| Drama
|-
|Spain's Worst Rail Disaster|| Sean Pertwee
|| 1 November 2013 (UK)
||
|-
|Spirital Phantoma|| Rares Ceuca
|| 31 March 2013 (UK)
|| Horror
|-
|Stand-Up: A Documentary by Jennifer Darwin|| Sezar Alkassab
|| 18 September 2013 (UK)
|| Comedy
|-
|Star Wars: The Force Unleashed|| Shaun Robertson
|| 19 October 2013 (UK)
|| Science fiction
|-
|Stitch'd Up|| Jayson Jacob Johnson
|| 
|| Comedy
|-
|Stricken|| Lee Convery
|| 10 September 2013 (UK)
|| Drama
|-
|Stunted Trees and Broken Bridges|| Tom Leach
|| 22 March 2013 (UK)
|| Science fiction
|-
|Super Tuesday|| Al Carretta
|| 20 August 2013 (UK)
|| Drama
|-
|Swan Lake 3D – Live from the Mariinsky Theatre|| Ross MacGibbon
|| 6 June 2013 (UK)
|| Musical
|-
|The Sweet Shop|| Ben Myers
|| 12 April 2013 (UK)
|| Drama
|-
|Switch: A Tale of Humility & Despair|| Jordon Sendall
|| 6 September 2013 (UK)
|| Comedy
|-
|Tales of the Supernatural: Naked|| Mark Behar
|| 9 December 2013 (UK)
|| Horror
|-
|Tamla Rose|| Joe Scott
|| 13 December 2013 (UK)
|| Musical
|-
|TEef: Bailey Jay|| Aro Korol
|| 1 October 2013 (UK)
|| Musical
|-
|Teenage Kicks|| Joe Wheeler
|| 9 June 2013 (UK)
|| Drama
|-
|Ten|| Craig Wyting
|| 10 October 2013 (UK)
|| Drama
|-
|They Love|| Daniel Sowter
|| 1 August 2013 (UK)
|| Horror
|-
|Third Row Centre|| Lloyd Handley
|| 
|| Mystery
|-
|Through the Fire|| Bryan Cook
|| 3 December 2013 (UK)
|| Drama
|-
|Time Together|| Mark Aerial Waller
|| 29 September 2013 (UK)
|| Mystery
|-
|TimeLock|| David Griffith
|| 23 August 2013 (UK)
|| Crime
|-
|Titus|| Charlie Cattrall
|| 28 September 2013 (UK)
|| Drama
|-
|Tottenham Hotspur Season Review 2012–2013|| Graham Keyte
|| 17 June 2013 (UK)
|| Sport
|-
|Trauma|| Trevor Hayward
|| 6 December 2013 (UK)
|| Thriller
|-
|Traveller|| Benjamin Johns
|| 6 December 2013 (UK)
|| Drama
|-
|The Trial of Socrates|| Natasa Prosenc Stearns
||
|| Drama
|-
|The Truth About Romance|| James G. Wall
|| 8 June 2013 (UK)
|| Comedy
|-
|Twilight of the Gods|| Julian Doyle
|| 4 March 2013 (USA)
|| Drama
|-
|Two Weeks Off|| Timothy Halls
|| 6 November 2013 (UK)
|| Adventure
|-
|Underbelly|| Kye Loren
|| 13 March 2015 (UK)
|| Action
|-
|Unlucky Bastard|| Latif Yahia
|| 9 June 2013 (UK)
|| Biography
|-
|Vacation Hunter|| Daz Spencer-Lovesey
|| 27 October 2013 (Belgium)
|| Adventure
|-
|Vampire Guitar: A High Vaultage Adventure|| Richard Pawelko
|| 1 July 2013 (UK)
|| Comedy
|-
|Van Helsinki|| Matthew Edwards
|| 13 September 2013 (UK)
|| Action
|-
|Verity's Summer|| Ben Crowe
|| 5 March 2013 (UK)
|| Drama
|-
|A Very Unsettled Summer|| Anca Damian
|| 1 November 2013 (Romania)
|| Drama
|-
|The View from Our House|| Anthea Kennedy
|| 
|| Historical
|-
|Vigilante|| Darren Bolton
||
|| Drama
|-
|A Viking Saga: The Darkest Day|| Chris Crow
|| 12 June 2013 (France)
|| Action
|-
|The Virgin Queen's Fatal Affair|| Tom Cholmondeley
|| 18 September 2013 (UK)
|| Historical
|-
|Visa|| Avishai Sivan
|| June 2013 (Israel)
|| Comedy
|-
|Visions Composed|| Timothy Davey
|| 3 November 2013 (UK)
|| Drama
|-
|Void|| Jack Ayers
||
|| Science fiction
|-
|Voodoo Magic|| Elom Bell
|| 1 October 2013 (UK)
|| Crime
|-
|Walk With Me?|| Giada Dobrzenska
|| 
|| Biography
|-
|The Wanderer|| Laure Prouvost
|| July 2013 (UK)
|| Drama
|-
|The Wanted: The Wanted Dream|| NJ Silva
|| 8 November 2013 (USA)
|| Musical
|-
|The Warehouse|| Andrew McGeary
|| 
|| Drama
|-
|A Warning to the Curious|| Ali Djarar
|| 28 February 2013 (UK)
|| Horror
|-
|Wasteland|| Tom Wadlow
|| 26 October 2013 (France)
|| Drama
|-
|Wayland's Song|| Richard Jobson
|| 20 September 2013 (UK)
|| Drama
|-
|Weaverfish|| Harrison Wall
|| 9 October 2013 (UK)
|| Drama
|-
|The Wedding|| Peter Andrew
|| 12 September 2013 (UK)
|| Comedy
|-
|Welcome to the Majority|| Russell Owen
|| 12 April 2013 (UK)
|| Thriller
|-
|We're Here for a Good Time, Not a Long Time|| Kerry Harrison
|| 
|| Drama
|-
|West Ham United Season Review 2012–2013|| Graham Keyte
|| 24 June 2013 (UK)
|| Sport
|-
|What Would Ridley Do?|| Ross Howieson
||
|| Comedy
|-
|White Collar Hooligan 2: England Away|| Paul Tanter
|| 20 November 2013 (Australia)
|| Crime
|-
|White Lie|| Nyima Cartier
|| 3 July 2013 (France)
|| Thriller
|-
|White Rabbit|| David Gowin
|| 17 September 2013 (UK)
|| Fantasy
|-
|Who Needs Enemies|| Peter Stylianou
|| 29 November 2013 (UK)
|| Crime
|-
|Whoops!|| Tony Hipwell
|| November 2013 (UK)
|| Comedy
|-
|The Wick: Dispatches from the Isle of Wonder|| Tom Metcalfe
||
|| Comedy
|-
|The Witching Hour|| Anthony M. Winson
|| 28 February 2013 (UK)
|| Horror
|-
|Wizard's Way|| Metal Man
|| 25 January 2013 (UK)
|| Comedy
|-
|Wolfskin: Sister of the Wolf Spirits|| Richard Mansfield
|| 
|| Animation
|-
|Woman from the East|| Jeet Matharru
|| 
|| Drama
|-
|The Wonderful World of Bill Maynard|| Rick McLeod
|| 1 December 2013 (UK)
|| Biography
|-
|Xanadu|| Dominic Reynolds
|| 11 August 2013 (UK)
|| Comedy
|-
|Y Syrcas|| Kevin Allen
|| 13 December 2013 (UK)
|| Drama
|-
|Young, High and Dead|| Luke Brady
|| 13 September 2013 (UK)
|| Horror
|-
|Zk3|| Michael J. Murphy
|| 20 January 2013 (UK)
|| Horror
|-
|Zombie Hood|| Steve Best
|| 8 June 2013 (UK)
|| Horror
|-
|The Zombie King|| Aidan Belizaire
|| 31 May 2013 (Japan)
|| Comedy
|-
|Zombies from Ireland|| Ryan Kift
|| 4 January 2013 (UK)
|| Horror
|-
|}

Co-productions

Of the 116 major British releases of 2013, 65 were co-productions with at least one other country. As with other years, the largest number of co-productions were made with the United States, with 37 films. They are listed in full below.

Highest grossing films

Listed here are the highest grossing British films of 2013, with their total earnings listed in British pound sterling. It includes films released in previous years that made money in 2013, particularly those that had minor releases in 2012 but their main releases in 2013.

Critical reception

Listed here are the top ten best and worst British films of those released in 2013, and listed above as major releases, as per the review aggregators Rotten Tomatoes and Metacritic. The critical scores for Rotten Tomatoes are out of a maximum score of 100, as is the critical score for Metacritic.

Rotten Tomatoes

Metacritic

British award winners

Listed here are the British winners and nominees at the five most prestigious film award ceremonies in the English-speaking world: the Academy Awards, British Academy Film Awards, Critics' Choice Awards, Golden Globe Awards and Screen Actors Guild Awards, that were held during 2013, celebrating the best films of 2012. The British nominations were led by Skyfall, Life of Pi, Les Misérables and The Best Exotic Marigold Hotel, the first three of which went on to receive large numbers of technical awards. In terms of main awards categories, Daniel Day-Lewis won many for the American film Lincoln and the Americans Ang Lee and Anne Hathaway won for Life of Pi and Les Misérables respectively. They did, however, notably lose out to Argo and Django Unchained (both from the United States).

Academy Awards
The 85th Academy Awards honouring the best films of 2012 were held on 24 February 2013.

British winners:

 Anna Karenina (Best Costume Design)
 Les Misérables (Best Supporting Actress, Best Makeup and Hairstyling, Best Sound Mixing)
 Life of Pi (Best Directing, Best Original Score, Best Cinematography, Best Visual Effects)
 Searching for Sugar Man (Best Documentary – Feature)
 Skyfall (Best Original Song, Best Sound Editing)
 Adele Adkins (Best Original Song) – Skyfall Andy Nelson (Best Sound Mixing) – Les Misérables Daniel Day-Lewis (Best Actor) – Lincoln Jacqueline Durran (Best Costume Design) – Anna Karenina Julie Dartnell (Best Makeup and Hairstyling) – Les Misérables Lisa Westcott (Best Makeup and Hairstyling) – Les Misérables Mark Paterson (Best Sound Mixing) – Les Misérables Paul Epworth (Best Original Song) – Skyfall Simon Chinn (Best Documentary – Feature) – Searching for Sugar Man Simon Hayes (Best Sound Mixing) – Les MisérablesBritish nominations:

 Anna Karenina (Best Production Design, Best Cinematography)
 Head over Heels (Best Animated Short Film)
 Hitchcock (Best Makeup and Hairstyling)
 Kon-Tiki (Best Foreign Language Film)
 Les Misérables (Best Picture, Best Actor, Best Original Song, Best Production Design, Best Costume Design)
 Life of Pi (Best Picture, Best Adapted Screenplay, Best Original Song, Best Production Design, Best Sound Editing, Best Sound Mixing, Best Film Editing)
 Prometheus (Best Visual Effects)
 Skyfall (Best Original Score, Best Cinematography, Best Sound Mixing)
 Snow White and the Huntsman (Best Costume Design, Best Visual Effects)
 The Pirates! In an Adventure with Scientists! (Best Animated Feature)
 Eve Stewart (Best Production Design) – Les Misérables Herbert Kretzmer (Best Original Song) – Life of Pi Joanna Johnston (Best Costume Design) – Lincoln Naomi Watts (Best Actress) – The Impossible Neil Corbould (Best Visual Effects) – Snow White and the Huntsman Peter King (Best Makeup and Hairstyling) – The Hobbit: An Unexpected Journey Peter Lord (Best Animated Feature) – ParaNorman Roger Deakins (Best Cinematography) – Skyfall Sam Fell (Best Animated Feature) – The Pirates! In an Adventure with Scientists! Seamus McGarvey (Best Cinematography) – Anna KareninaBritish Academy Film Awards
The 66th British Academy Film Awards were held on 16 February 2013.

British winners:

 Anna Karenina (Best Costume Design)
 Les Misérables (Best Actress in a Supporting Role, Best Sound, Best Production Design, Best Makeup and Hair)
 Life of Pi (Best Cinematography, Best Special Visual Effects)
 Searching for Sugar Man (Best Documentary)
 Skyfall (Outstanding British Film, Best Original Music)
 The Imposter (Outstanding Debut by a British Writer, Director or Producer)
 Alan Parker (Academy Fellowship)
 Bart Layton (Outstanding Debut by a British Writer, Director or Producer) The Imposter Daniel Day-Lewis (Best Actor in a Leading Role) – Lincoln Dmitri Doganis (Outstanding Debut by a British Writer, Director or Producer) The Imposter Juno Temple (EE Rising Star Award)
 Michael Palin (Academy Fellowship)
 Tessa Ross (Outstanding British Contribution to Cinema)

British nominations:

 Anna Karenina (Best Cinematography, Outstanding British Film, Best Original Music, Best Production Design, Best Makeup and Hair)
 Great Expectations (Best Costume Design)
 Hitchcock (Best Actress in a Leading Role, Best Makeup and Hair)
 I Am Nasrine (Outstanding Debut by a British Writer, Director or Producer)
 Les Misérables (Best Film, Best Actor in a Leading Role, Best Cinematography, Outstanding British Film, Best Costume Design)
 Life of Pi (Best Film, Best Director, Best Adapted Screenplay, Best Original Music, Best Sound, Best Production Design, Best Editing)
 Marley (Best Documentary)
 McCullin (Outstanding Debut by a British Writer, Director or Producer, Best Documentary)
 Prometheus (Best Special Visual Effects)
 Seven Psychopaths (Outstanding British Film)
 Skyfall (Best Actor in a Supporting Role, Best Actress in a Supporting Role, Best Cinematography, Best Sound, Best Production Design, Best Editing)
 Snow White and the Huntsman (Best Costume Design)
 The Best Exotic Marigold Hotel (Outstanding British Film)
 The Dark Knight Rises (Best Special Visual Effects)
 The Imposter (Best Documentary)
 Wild Bill (Outstanding Debut by a British Writer, Director or Producer)
 Andrea Riseborough (EE Rising Star Award)
 Danny King (Outstanding Debut by a British Writer, Director or Producer) – Wild Bill David Morris (Outstanding Debut by a British Writer, Director or Producer) – McCullin Dexter Fletcher (Outstanding Debut by a British Writer, Director or Producer) – Wild Bill Helen Mirren (Best Actress in a Leading Role) – Hitchcock Jaqui Morris (Outstanding Debut by a British Writer, Director or Producer) – McCullin James Bobin (Outstanding Debut by a British Writer, Director or Producer) – The Muppets Judi Dench (Best Actress in a Supporting Role) – Skyfall Tina Gharavi (Outstanding Debut by a British Writer, Director or Producer) – I Am NasrineCritics' Choice Awards
The 18th Critics' Choice Awards were held on 10 January 2013.

British winners:

 Anna Karenina (Best Art Direction, Best Costume Design)
 Les Misérables (Best Supporting Actress)
 Life of Pi (Best Cinematography, Best Visual Effects)
 Searching for Sugar Man (Best Documentary Feature)
 Skyfall (Best Action Movie, Best Actor in an Action Movie, Best Song)
 Adele Adkins (Best Song) – Skyfall Daniel Craig (Best Actor in an Action Movie) – Skyfall Daniel Day-Lewis (Best Actor) – Lincoln Jacqueline Durran (Best Costume Design) – Anna Karenina Paul Epworth (Best Song) – SkyfallBritish nominations:

 Ginger & Rosa (Best Young Actor/Actress)
 Les Misérables (Best Picture, Best Director, Best Actor, Best Acting Ensemble, Best Art Direction, Best Cinematography, Best Costume Design, Best Editing, Best Makeup, Best Song)
 Life of Pi (Best Picture, Best Director, Best Young Actor/Actress, Best Adapted Screenplay, Best Art Direction, Best Editing, Best Score)
 Prometheus (Best Sci-Fi/Horror Movie)
 Skyfall (Best Supporting Actor, Best Supporting Actress, Best Actress in an Action Movie, Best Cinematography)
 The Best Exotic Marigold Hotel (Best Acting Ensemble)
 The Dark Knight Rises (Best Action Movie, Best Actor in an Action Movie, Best Actress in an Action Movie, Best Visual Effects)
 The Imposter (Best Documentary Feature)
 Ben Lovett (Best Song) – Brave Chris Dickens (Best Editing) – Les Misérables Christian Bale (Best Actor in an Action Movie) – The Dark Knight Rises Danny Cohen (Best Cinematography) – Les Misérables Eve Stewart (Best Art Direction) – Les Misérables Herbert Kretzmer (Best Song) – Les Misérables Jasmine van den Bogaerde (Best Song) – Brave Joanna Johnston (Best Costume Design) – Lincoln Jonny Greenwood (Best Score) – The Master Judi Dench (Best Supporting Actress, Best Actress in an Action Movie) – Skyfall Marcus Mumford (Best Song) – Brave Naomi Watts (Best Actress) – The Impossible Roger Deakins (Best Cinematography) – Skyfall Ted Dwane (Best Song) – Brave Tom Holland (Best Young Actor/Actress) – The Impossible Tom Hooper (Best Director) – Les Misérables Winston Marshall (Best Song) – BraveGolden Globe Awards
The 70th Golden Globe Awards were held on 13 January 2013.

British winners:

 Les Misérables (Best Motion Picture – Musical or Comedy, Best Actor – Motion Picture Musical or Comedy, Best Supporting Actress)
 Life of Pi (Best Original Score)
 Skyfall (Best Original Song)
 Adele Adkins (Best Original Song) – Skyfall Daniel Day-Lewis (Best Actor – Motion Picture Drama) – Lincoln Paul Epworth (Best Original Song) – SkyfallBritish nominations:

 Anna Karenina (Best Original Score)
 Hitchcock (Best Actress – Motion Picture Drama)
 Hyde Park on Hudson (Best Actor – Motion Picture Musical or Comedy)
 Kon-Tiki (Best Foreign Language Film)
 Les Misérables (Best Original Song)
 Life of Pi (Best Motion Picture – Drama, Best Director)
 Quartet (Best Actress – Motion Picture Musical or Comedy)
 Salmon Fishing in the Yemen (Best Motion Picture – Musical or Comedy, Best Actor – Motion Picture Musical or Comedy, Best Actress – Motion Picture Musical or Comedy)
 The Best Exotic Marigold Hotel (Best Motion Picture – Musical or Comedy, Best Actress – Motion Picture Musical or Comedy)
 The Deep Blue Sea (Best Actress – Motion Picture Drama)
 Emily Blunt (Best Actress – Motion Picture Musical or Comedy) – Salmon Fishing in the Yemen Ewan McGregor (Best Actor – Motion Picture Musical or Comedy) – Salmon Fishing in the Yemen Helen Mirren (Best Actress – Motion Picture Drama) – Hitchcock Judi Dench (Best Actress – Motion Picture Musical or Comedy) – The Best Exotic Marigold Hotel Maggie Smith (Best Actress – Motion Picture Musical or Comedy) – Quartet Naomi Watts (Best Actress – Motion Picture Drama) – The Impossible Rachel Weisz (Best Actress – Motion Picture Drama) – The Deep Blue SeaScreen Actors Guild Awards
The 19th Screen Actors Guild Awards were held on 27 January 2013.

British winners:

 Les Misérables (Outstanding Performance by a Female Actor in a Supporting Role)
 Skyfall (Outstanding Performance by a Stunt Ensemble in a Motion Picture)
 Daniel Day-Lewis (Outstanding Performance by a Male Actor in a Leading Role) – LincolnBritish nominations:

 Hitchcock (Outstanding Performance by a Female Actor in a Leading Role)
 Les Misérables (Outstanding Performance by a Male Actor in a Leading Role, Outstanding Performance by a Cast in a Motion Picture, Outstanding Performance by a Stunt Ensemble in a Motion Picture)
 Skyfall (Outstanding Performance by a Male Actor in a Supporting Role)
 The Best Exotic Marigold Hotel (Outstanding Performance by a Female Actor in a Supporting Role, Outstanding Performance by a Cast in a Motion Picture)
 The Dark Knight Rises (Outstanding Performance by a Stunt Ensemble in a Motion Picture)
 Bill Nighy (Outstanding Performance by a Cast in a Motion Picture) – The Best Exotic Marigold Hotel Celia Imrie (Outstanding Performance by a Cast in a Motion Picture) – The Best Exotic Marigold Hotel Daniel Day-Lewis (Outstanding Performance by a Cast in a Motion Picture) – Lincoln Dev Patel (Outstanding Performance by a Cast in a Motion Picture) – The Best Exotic Marigold Hotel Eddie Redmayne (Outstanding Performance by a Cast in a Motion Picture) – Les Misérables Helena Bonham Carter (Outstanding Performance by a Cast in a Motion Picture) – Les Misérables Helen Mirren (Outstanding Performance by a Female Actor in a Leading Role) – Hitchcock Isabelle Allen (Outstanding Performance by a Cast in a Motion Picture) – Les Misérables Judi Dench (Outstanding Performance by a Cast in a Motion Picture) – The Best Exotic Marigold Hotel Maggie Smith (Outstanding Performance by a Female Actor in a Supporting Role, Outstanding Performance by a Cast in a Motion Picture) – The Best Exotic Marigold Hotel Naomi Watts (Outstanding Performance by a Female Actor in a Leading Role) – The Impossible Ronald Pickup (Outstanding Performance by a Cast in a Motion Picture) – The Best Exotic Marigold Hotel Sacha Baron Cohen (Outstanding Performance by a Cast in a Motion Picture) – Les Misérables Samantha Barks (Outstanding Performance by a Cast in a Motion Picture) – Les Misérables Tom Wilkinson (Outstanding Performance by a Cast in a Motion Picture) – The Best Exotic Marigold Hotel Penelope Wilton (Outstanding Performance by a Cast in a Motion Picture) – The Best Exotic Marigold Hotel''

Notable deaths

See also

 2013 in film
 2013 in British music
 2013 in British radio
 2013 in British television
 2013 in the United Kingdom
 List of 2013 box office number-one films in the United Kingdom
 List of British films of 2012
 List of British films of 2014

References

External links
 2013 in film
 List of 2013 box office number-one films in the United Kingdom
 

2013
Films
Lists of 2013 films by country or language